This is a list of schools in the metropolitan Borough of South Tyneside in North East England.

State-funded schools

Primary schools

Ashley Primary School, South Shields
Bede Burn Primary School, Jarrow
Biddick Hall Infants' School, South Shields
Biddick Hall Junior School, South Shields
Cleadon CE Academy, Cleadon
Dunn Street Primary School, Jarrow
East Boldon Infants' School, East Boldon
East Boldon Junior School, East Boldon
Fellgate Primary School, Jarrow
Forest View Primary School, South Shields
Hadrian Primary School, South Shields
Harton Primary School, South Shields
Hebburn Lakes Primary School, Hebburn
Hedworth Lane Primary School, Boldon Colliery
Hedworthfield Primary School, Jarrow
Holy Trinity CE Academy, South Shields
Jarrow Cross CE Primary School, Jarrow
Laygate Community School, South Shields
Lord Blyton Primary School, South Shields
Marine Park Primary School, South Shields
Marsden Primary School, Whitburn
Monkton Academy, South Shields
Monkton Infants' School, South Shields
Mortimer Primary School, South Shields
Ridgeway Primary Academy, South Shields
St Aloysius' RC Infant School, Hebburn
St Aloysius' RC Junior School, Hebburn
St Bede's RC Primary School, Jarrow
St Bede's RC Primary School, South Shields
St Gregory's RC Primary School, South Shields
St James RC Primary School, Hebburn
St Joseph's RC Primary School, Jarrow
St Mary's RC Primary School, Jarrow
St Matthew's RC Primary School, Jarrow
St Oswald's CE Primary School, Hebburn
St Oswald's RC Primary School, South Shields
Ss Peter and Paul RC Primary School, Tyne Dock
Sea View Primary School, South Shields
Simonside Primary School, Jarrow
Stanhope Primary School, South Shields
Toner Avenue Primary School, Hebburn
Valley View Primary School, Jarrow
West Boldon Primary School, West Boldon
Westoe Crown Primary School, Westoe
Whitburn Village Primary School, Whitburn

Secondary schools

Boldon School, Boldon Colliery
Harton Academy, South Shields
Hebburn Comprehensive School, Hebburn
Jarrow School, Jarrow
Mortimer Community College, South Shields
St Joseph's Catholic Academy, Hebburn
St Wilfrid's RC College, South Shields
Whitburn Church of England Academy, Whitburn

Special and alternative schools
Bamburgh School, South Shields
The Beacon Centre, South Shields
Epinay Business and Enterprise School, Jarrow
Keelman's Way School, Hebburn
Park View School, South Shields

Further education
South Tyneside College

South Tyneside
Schools in the Metropolitan Borough of South Tyneside
Lists of buildings and structures in Tyne and Wear